Eduardo Yáñez Luévano (born September 25, 1960) is a Mexican actor.

Biography
Yáñez was born in Mexico City, Mexico. He lived with his mother. He never met his father.

Career
Producer Ernesto Alonso saw his potential and gave him his first role in the soap opera Quiéreme siempre. Yáñez played the role of "Carlos" alongside the actress Victoria Ruffo.

Yáñez married his first wife, Norma Adriana Garcia, in 1987. They had a son named Eduardo Yáñez Jr.  They were divorced three years later.

In 1991, Yáñez moved to the United States where he worked on two soap operas for Capital Vision, Marielena and Guadalupe.

Later he worked in Hollywood, on movies such as Striptease, Wild Things, and Megiddo. His most recent American movie was The Punisher.  He has also worked in television series such as Savannah and Soldier of Fortune. He also worked in Sleeper Cell and Cold Case.

In 1996, Yáñez married Francesca Cruz, a Cuban-American he met in Miami.  They lived in Los Angeles and Miami.  In January 2003 they filed for divorce.

In 2005, after a long absence, Yáñez returned to Mexico and appeared in the soap opera La Verdad Oculta.

In 2007, he starred in Destilando Amor, "La Mejor Telenovela del Año", "Best Telenovela of the Year" (Premios TVyNovelas 2008). He played Rodrigo Montalvo Santos and Angélica Rivera played his love interest and portraited Teresa Hernández, also known as "La Gaviota" and Mariana Franco.

In 2008, he starred in Fuego En La Sangre, a new version of the Colombian telenovela Pasión de Gavilanes, in which he played the role of Juan Reyes, Franco's older brother (Pablo Montero) and Oscar (Jorge Salinas).

In 2009, he starred in the soap opera Corazon Salvaje with Aracely Arambula, produced by Salvador Mejia for Televisa.

In 2011, he appeared as a Venezuelan politician in an episode of the second season of NCIS: Los Angeles.

In 2012, Yáñez appeared in another telenovela for Televisa starring in the telenovela Amores Verdaderos, in which he played the role of José Ángel Arriaga.

In 2015, Yáñez came back to star in the telenovela Amores con Trampa, in which he played the role of Facundo Carmona.

In 2019, he starred in the motion picture comedy ¡He matado a mi marido! next to Maria Conchita Alonso

He has appeared in 8 theatrical plays, 13 soap operas, 33 movies (of which 8 are in English) and is still working on projects in Hollywood.

Filmography

Film

Television

Awards and nominations

Premios ACE (New York)

Emmy Awards

Premios Bravo

Premios Juventud

TVyNovelas Awards

Favoritos del público

References

External links
 Eduardo Yáñez Biography

1960 births
Living people
Mexican male film actors
Mexican male telenovela actors
Male actors from Mexico City